The 1888–89 AHAC season was the third season of the Amateur Hockey Association of Canada. Play was in challenges and started on December 15, 1888. The Montreal Hockey Club would win the final challenge of the season against the Montreal Victorias to win the Canadian championship for the second season in a row.

League business 
The annual meeting of the Amateur Hockey Association was held in the Victoria Skating Rink, Montreal, on November 16, 1888. Representatives from most of the hockey clubs were present. The election for the ensuing year resulted as follows:

 President, Mr. J. Stewart;
 first vice-president, A. Shearer;
 second vice-president, D. B. Holden;
 secretary-treasurer, A. Hodgson.
 Council — H. Kinghorn (McGill), S. Lee (Crystal), T. Arnton (Victoria), A. C. Higginson (Montreal).

Rule changes 
The league reverted to the challenge system, hoping to attract teams from outside Montreal. Quebec would return to play in the AHAC. The number of games was reduced to only four.

The league adopted a rule where the placement of the 'bully' or faceoff, could be played at the point of infringement, or at the point of play stoppage, at the choice of the captain of the offended team after a rules infraction.

Regular season 
This season saw two teams from outside of Montreal and Ottawa to make challenges. Halifax(Dartmouth) had not challenged for the national championships before, while Quebec had played in the Montreal tournaments. McGill did not return to mount a challenge this year. Ottawa did not play a challenge, but did play an exhibition against the Montreal Hockey Club in Ottawa.

Halifax Chebuctos would play two games in Montreal, both played half under "Montreal rules", half under "Halifax rules". Halifax would lose 6–1 to Montreal and 4–1 to Crystals. Both games were played at the Crystal Palace skating rink. The two games are recorded in the overall record.

The Chebuctos would play two games against Quebec, losing 8–0 and 5–1.

Overall record

Schedule and results

Player statistics

Scoring leaders 
Note: GP = Games played, G = Goals scored

Goaltending averages 
Note: GP = Games played, GA = Goals against, SO = Shutouts, GAA = Goals against average

Montreal HC 1889 AHAC champions

References

Bibliography

Notes 

1888
AHAC